Amoghavarsha I (also known as Amoghavarsha Nrupathunga I) (r.814–878 CE) was the greatest emperor of the Rashtrakuta dynasty, and one of the most notable rulers of Ancient India. His reign of 64 years is one of the longest precisely dated monarchical reigns on record. Many Kannada and Sanskrit scholars prospered during his rule, including the great Indian mathematician Mahaviracharya who wrote Ganita-sara-samgraha, Jinasena, Virasena, Shakatayan and Sri Vijaya (a Kannada language theorist). 

Amoghavarsha I  was an accomplished poet and scholar. He wrote (or co-authored) the Kavirajamarga, the earliest extant literary work in Kannada,  and Prashnottara Ratnamalika, a religious work in Sanskrit. During his rule he held titles such as Nrupathunga, Atishadhavala, Veeranarayana, Rattamarthanda and Srivallabha. He moved the Rashtrakuta regal capital from Mayurkhandi in the Bidar district to Manyakheta in the Kalaburagi district in the modern Karnataka state. He is said to have built the regal city to "match that of Lord Indra". The capital city was planned to include elaborately designed buildings for the royalty using the finest of workmanship. 

The Arab traveler Sulaiman described Amoghavarsha as one of the "four great kings of the world." For his religious temperament, his interest in the fine arts and literature and his peace-loving nature, historian Panchamukhi  has compared him to the emperor Ashoka and given him the honorific "Ashoka of the South". Amoghavarsha seems to have entertained the highest admiration for the language, literature and culture of the Kannada people as testified to in the text Kavirajamarga.

Early years
Amoghavarsha I (whose birth name was Sharva) was born in 800 CE in Sribhavan on the banks of the river Narmada during the return journey of his father, Emperor Govinda III, from his successful campaigns in northern India. This information is available from the Manne inscription of 803 and the Sanjan plates of 871, both important sources of information about Amoghavarsha I. The Sirur plates further clarify that Amoghavarsha I  ascended to the throne in 815 at the age of 14 after the death of his father. All his inscriptions thereafter refer to him as Amoghavarsha I.

A revolt led by some of his relatives together with feudatories of the empire temporarily unseated Amoghavarsha I, who, with the help of his cousin (Karka) also called Patamalla, re-established himself as the emperor by 821. This information comes from the Surat records and the Baroda plates of 835. The first to revolt was the Western Ganga feudatory led by King Shivamara II. In the series of battles that followed, Shivamara II was killed in 816. But Amoghavarsha I's commander and confidant, Bankesha, was defeated in Rajaramadu by the next Ganga king, Rachamalla. Due to the resilience of the Western Gangas, Amoghavarsha I was forced to follow a conciliatory policy. He gave in marriage his daughter, Chandrabbalabbe, to the Western Ganga King Butuga I, and another daughter, Revakanimmadi, to prince Ereganga. More revolts occurred between 818 and 820, but by 821 Amoghavarsha I had overcome all resistance and established a stable kingdom to rule.

Amoghavarsha ruled from 815 to 877 CE.

Wars in the south

Vijayaditya II of the Eastern Chalukya family overthrew Bhima Salki, the ruling Rashtrakuta feudatory at Vengi, took possession of the throne and continued his hostilities against the Rashtrakutas. He captured Sthambha (modern Kammamettu), a Rashtrakuta stronghold. From the Cambay and Sangli plates it is known that Amoghavarsha I overwhelmingly defeated the Vengi Chalukyas and drove them out of their strongholds in the battle of Vingavalli. The Bagumra records mention  a "Sea of Chalukyas" invading the Ratta kingdom which  Amoghavarsha I successfully defended. After these victories he assumed the title Veeranarayana.

Tranquility was restored temporarily by a marriage between Vijayaditya II's son, Vishnuvardhana V, and the Ratta princess Shilamahadevi, a sister of Karka of the Gujarat Rashtrakuta branch. However, Vishnuvardhana V attacked the northern Kalachuri feudatory of the Rashtrakutas in Tripuri, central India, and captured Elichpur near Nasik. Amoghavarsha I killed Vishnuvardhana V in 846 but continued a friendly relationship with the next Eastern Chalukya ruler Gunaga Vijayaditya III, and suppressed the recalcitrant Alupas of South Canara under prince Vimaladitya in 870. Likewise, Amoghavarsha I  maintained  friendly interactions with the Pallava who were busy keeping the Pandyas at bay. The Pallavas had marital ties with the Rashtrakutas as well. Nandivarman was married to a Ratta princess, Sankha, and their son was also called Nripathunga. This has prompted historians to suggest that the Pallava king must have married Nrupatunga Amoghavarsha I's daughter.

The Sanjan inscriptions of 871 claim Amoghavarsha I made a great effort to overthrow the kingdom of the Dravidas and that the mobilization of his armies struck terror into the hearts of the kings of modern-day Kerala, Pandya, Chola, Kalinga, Magadha, Gujarat and Pallava. The record also states that Amoghavarsha I had imprisoned the Gangavamshi ruler and those in his own court who had carried out plots against him for life.

Amoghavarsha's reign lasted until 877 AD after which he had voluntarily retired from his throne.

Religion, culture and literature

Amoghavarsha I preferred to remain friendly with all his neighbours and feudatories and avoided taking an aggressive posture against them. It is still debated whether he abdicated his throne at times to fulfill religious pursuits. He deeply cared for his subjects and once when a calamity threatened to harm them (according to the Sanjan plates), he offered his finger as a sacrifice to the goddess Mahalakshmi of Kolhapur. For this benevolent act the Sanjan inscription likens him to puranic heroes such as Bali, Shibi and Jimutavahana (hero of the play Nagananda). It is written that the rulers of Vanga, Anga, Magadha, Malwa and Vengi worshipped him.

Amoghavarsha I was a disciple of Acharya Jinasena. Proof for this comes from the writing, Mahapurana (also known as Uttara Purana) by Gunabhadra in which the author states "blissful for the world is the existence of Jinasenacharya, by bowing to whom Amoghavarsha Nrupathunga considered himself to be purified". The same writing proves that Amoghavarsha I was a follower of the Digambara branch of Jainism. Amoghavarsha I patronised Jainism, Buddhism, and Hinduism. However, according to the scholar Reu, writings such as Mahapurana by Gunabhadra, Prashnottara Ratnamalika and Mahaviracharya's Ganita-sara-sangraha are evidence  that Amoghavarsha Nrupathunga I had taken to Jainism. According to Arab traveller Suleiman, Amoghavarsha I's empire was one among the four great contemporary empires of the world and because of his  peaceful and loving nature, he has been compared to Emperor Ashoka. The Jain Narayana temple of Pattadakal, (a UNESCO World Heritage Site) a basadi at Konnur and the Neminatha Basadi at Manyakheta were built during his rule. His queen was Asagavve.  Famous among scholars during his time were Mahaviracharya, Virasena, Jinasena, Gunabhadra, Shakatayan, and Sri Vijaya.

Writings
Amoghavarsha was a scholar in Kannada and Sanskrit literature. His own writing Kavirajamarga is a landmark literary work in the Kannada language and became a guide book for future poets and scholars for centuries to come. The Sanskrit writing Prashnottara Ratnamalika is said to have been written by Amoghavarsha I  in his old age when he had distanced himself from the affairs of the state. However others argue that it may have been written by Adi Shankara or by Vimalacharya.

There is a mention of several Kannada authors in his works who preceded him. Those who wrote in prose were Vimala, Udaya, Nagarjuna, Jayabandhu and Durvinita, whereas those who wrote in poetry were Srivijaya, Kavisvara, Pandita, Chandra and Lokapala.

References

Citations

Sources

External links
 History of Karnataka, Mr. Arthikaje

800 births
878 deaths
History of Karnataka
Kannada poets
9th-century Indian Jains
9th-century Indian monarchs
Jain monarchs
Rashtrakuta dynasty
9th-century rulers in Asia
9th-century Indian poets
Indian male poets
Indian Sanskrit scholars